Juan Carlos "J.C." Giménez Ferreyra (born 20 December 1960) is a Paraguayan boxer. During his career he was WBC International light heavyweight champion and unsuccessfully fought for the World Super Middleweight title four times, first against Mauro Galvano in 1992, then against Chris Eubank the same year, against Nigel Benn in 1994 and finally against Joe Calzaghe in 1998, losing via doctor stopage.

During his career he went the distance with Nigel Benn, Chris Eubank and Roberto Durán. He remained as the No. 1 in the world for 9 years in the WBO and was the WBC International World Champion.

He last fought in 2010, winning the Paraguayan Cruiserweight title against Nicasio Moray Martinez.

External links
https://www.lanacion.com.py/2017/02/14/mejor-boxeador-paraguayo-dara-clases-gratuitas-menores/
 

1960 births
Living people
People from Asunción
Paraguayan male boxers
Sportspeople from Asunción
Light-middleweight boxers
20th-century Paraguayan people